This table shows an overview of the monuments of Aruba. 

|}

Gallery of other monuments, category 2

References
 Monuments fund Aruba 

 
Aruba-related lists